Dezső Földes (30 December 1880 in Miskolc, Kingdom of Hungary – 27 March 1950 in Cleveland, United States) was a Hungarian saber fencer.

Olympics
Földes won gold medals in team saber at the 1908 Summer Olympics in London and at the 1912 Summer Olympics in Stockholm.

Life
He was Jewish, and was born into a Hungarian Jewish family in Miskolc, Kingdom of Hungary. Földes moved to the United States in 1912, and set up a hospital clinic for the poor in Cleveland, where he died in 1950.

See also
List of select Jewish fencers

References

Further reading

External links
 
 
 Olympic record at databaseOlympics.com

1880 births
1950 deaths
Sportspeople from Miskolc
Jewish Hungarian sportspeople
19th-century Hungarian people
20th-century Hungarian people
Jewish male sabre fencers
Hungarian male sabre fencers
Olympic fencers of Hungary
Fencers at the 1908 Summer Olympics
Fencers at the 1912 Summer Olympics
Olympic gold medalists for Hungary
Olympic medalists in fencing
Medalists at the 1908 Summer Olympics
Medalists at the 1912 Summer Olympics